32532 Thereus , provisional designation: , is a centaur from the outer Solar System, approximately  in diameter. It was discovered on 9 August 2001, by astronomers of the Near-Earth Asteroid Tracking program at the Palomar Observatory in California, United States. This minor planet was named for the phrase thēreios bia 'beastly strength', used to describe centaurs in Greek mythology.

Orbit and classification 

Thereus orbits the Sun at a distance of 8.5–12.7 AU once every 34 years and 8 months (12,676 days). Its orbit has an eccentricity of 0.20 and an inclination of 20° with respect to the ecliptic.

The body's observation arc begins with a precovery taken by Spacewatch at Kitt Peak Observatory in June 1995, more than 6 years prior to its official discovery observation by NEAT at Palomar.

Naming 

This minor planet was named after Thereus, a centaur from Greek mythology. He is described as a hunter who captured bears and carried them home, alive and struggling. The official naming citation was published by the Minor Planet Center on 14 June 2003.

Physical characteristics

Rotation period 

Since the early 2000s, several rotational lightcurves of Thereus were obtained from photometric observations with a period between 8.30 and 8.3386 hours. Analysis of the consolidated, best-rated lightcurve gave a rotation period of 8.335 hours and a brightness amplitude of 0.38 magnitude.

Diameter and albedo 

According to observations made by the NEOWISE mission of NASA's Wide-field Infrared Survey Explorer, ESA's Herschel Space Observatory with its PACS instrument, and the Spitzer Space Telescope, Thereus measures between 62 and 86.5 kilometers in diameter and its surface has an albedo between 0.059 and 0.0975.

The Collaborative Asteroid Lightcurve Link assumes a standard albedo for carbonaceous minor planets of 0.057 and derives a diameter of 77.19 kilometers based on an absolute magnitude of 9.29.

See also

References

External links 
 Asteroid Lightcurve Database (LCDB), query form (info )
 Dictionary of Minor Planet Names, Google books
 Asteroids and comets rotation curves, CdR – Observatoire de Genève, Raoul Behrend
 Discovery Circumstances: Numbered Minor Planets (30001)-(35000) – Minor Planet Center
 
 

Centaurs (small Solar System bodies)
032532
Named minor planets
20010809